Lin Chien-ju (born 12 September 1977) is a swimmer who represented Chinese Taipei at the 1996 Summer Olympic Games.

Olympics 

Lin finished 38th in the women's 50m freestyle out of 55 competitors. She took part in the women's 4 × 100 metre freestyle relay finishing 18th and placed 24th in the women's 4 × 100 metre medley relay.

References

1977 births
Living people
Olympic swimmers of Taiwan
Swimmers at the 1996 Summer Olympics
Taiwanese female freestyle swimmers